The Modern Egypt Party ( Hizb Masr al-Haditha) is an Egyptian political party made up of former members of the NDP. The party withdrew from the Egyptian Front.

References

External links
Modern Egypt Party website

2011 establishments in Egypt
Political parties established in 2011